Crystal Music is an American-born thoroughbred racehorse and winner of the Fillies' Mile at Ascot. She was one of the last offspring of the leading sire Nureyev, who died in 2001.

References

1998 racehorse births
Racehorses bred in Kentucky
Racehorses trained in the United Kingdom
Thoroughbred family 1-s